Pyotr Semyonovich Baluyev (21 June 1857 – 1923 in Moscow) was an army general in the Imperial Russian Army and commander of the Southwestern Front from 24 July 1917 to 31 July 1917.

Biography 
Baluyev was an inspector and an instructor in the Red Army under Bolshevik command after the Russian Revolution of 1917.

References

External links

1857 births
1923 deaths
Imperial Russian Army generals
Russian Provisional Government generals
Russian military personnel of World War I
Soviet military personnel
Recipients of the Order of St. Anna, 1st class